The  is a railway service proposed by East Japan Railway Company that would link Haneda Airport directly to central Tokyo.  The plan composes which will consist of three branches departing from Haneda and branching west towards Osaki and Shinjuku, north towards Shinbashi and Tokyo Station, and east towards Shin-Kiba.

In 2021, JR East announced that they have received Ministry of Land, Infrastructure, Transport and Tourism approval for the project and intended to start construction in 2022, for completion by 2029.

History 
Due to the growing demand of air travelers using Haneda Airport, especially international travelers, East Japan Railway Company, JR East, officially announced in the “JR East Group Management Vision V” issued in 2013 that they aimed to improve the accessibility to the airport. 

In 2014, JR East released its fundamental construction plan for the accessibility improvement. According to the plan, an existing freight line running from Tamachi Station located on Yamanote Line will be extended, connecting directly to the airport through an underwater tunnel. The newly-constructed section is expected about 5 km long, running from the existing Tokyo Freight Terminal to a new 
Therefore, the construction cost is expected to be minimized, estimated to be approximately 320 billion JPY.  

In the JR East Group Management Vision "Move Up” issued in 2018, JR East decided to construct three conventional lines departing from the airport.

In 2019, JR East officially launched the environmental assessment for the new lines, and the construction for the new train link is expected to be completed around 2029.

Routes and Expected Effects 

The line consists of an extension of an existing freight line to the airport, upgrading of track on the existing freight line, two connecting spurs to the Rinkai Line, and a connecting spur to the Ueno-Tokyo Line, which allows three access routes to the airport.

East Yamanote Route 
The East Yamanote Route will run from the airport station located near Terminals 1 and 2 in Haneda Airport via the Tokyo Freight Terminal Station to a point near Tamachi Station, using an unused freight line between Tamachi and Tokyo Freight Terminal to connect to the Tokaido Main Line (Ueno-Tokyo Line). By running through trains on the Ueno–Tokyo Line, through service can be offered to Tokyo Station, Ueno Station, and northbound lines including the Takasaki Line, Utsunomiya Line, and Joban Line, allowing service to the northern suburbs of Tokyo. Since the East Yamanote Route will link directly Tokyo Station and the airport, accessibility to the airport is expected to be greatly improved. Travel times between Tokyo and Haneda are estimated to decrease from the current 28 minutes to 18 minutes.

West Yamanote Route 
The West Yamanote Route connects the new line to Oimachi Station on the Rinkai Line, which operates as a through service with the Saikyo Line connecting to major terminal stations on the west side of the Yamanote Line including Osaki, Ebisu, Shibuya, Shinjuku, and Ikebukuro, as well as points north in Tokyo and Saitama Prefecture. Travel time between Shinjuku and Haneda will be reduced from 43 minutes at present to 23 minutes.

Coastal Area Route 
The Coastal Area Route connects Tokyo Freight Terminal to the Rinkai Line for Odaiba (Tokyo Teleport Station) and the Tokyo waterfront. This also allows for future through service to the Keiyo Line for Maihama (Tokyo Disney Resort) and points east in Chiba Prefecture. The travel time between Haneda and Shin-Kiba Station on the Keiyo Line will decrease from 41 minutes to 20 minutes.

This route is also planned to connect to the Tokyo Rinkai Subway Line, a new subway line under planning between Tokyo and Odaiba. Through service to the Tokyo Rinkai Subway Line as well as the Tsukuba Express (through a future Tokyo-Akihabara connector) is under consideration.

References

Airport rail links in Japan
Proposed railway lines in Japan
Haneda Airport
Railway lines in Tokyo
Lines of East Japan Railway Company